Nazanin Bassiri-Gharb is a mechanical engineer in the field of micro and nano engineering and mechanics of materials. She is the Harris Saunders, Jr. Chair and Professor in the George W. Woodruff School of Mechanical Engineering at the Georgia Institute of Technology in Atlanta, Georgia. Bassiri-Gharb leads the Smart Materials, Advanced Research and Technology (SMART) Laboratory at Georgia Tech. Her research seeks to characterize and optimize the optical and electric response of interferometric modulator (IMOD) displays. She also investigates novel materials to improve reliability and processing of IMOD.

Education 
Bassiri-Gharb obtained her Laurea Degree from the University of Padua in Italy in 2001. She graduated with a Doctorate of Philosophy in Materials Science and Engineering from Pennsylvania State University in 2005. Her thesis was entitled Dielectric and Piezoelectric Nonlinearities in Oriented Pb(Yb1/2Nb1/2)03-PbTiO3 Thin Films.

Career

Research interests 
Bassiri-Gharb is interested in applying ferroelectric and multiferroic materials to micro- and nano- electromechanical systems. She is also interested in using these materials to develop novel sensors and actuators for the fields of environmental energy harvesting, tunable photonic crystals, and ultrasonic transducers. Additionally, Bassiri-Gharb researches peizoelectric MEMS devices to manipulate nanoscale materials.

Professional societies 

Institute of Electrical and Electronics Engineers - Ultrasonics, Ferroelectrics, and Frequency Control Society (IEEE UFFC-S)
Institute of Electrical and Electronics Engineers (IEEE)- Women in Engineering
Society of Women Engineers

Professional committees 
Bassiri-Gharb has sat and sits on several professional committees.

Scientific Reports, Editorial Board: 2014–present
IEEE UFFC-S, President: 2018-2019
IEEE UFFC-S, President-Elect: 2016-2017
IEEE UFFC-S, Newsletter Editor-in-Chief: 2012-2013
IEEE Transactions on Ultrasonics, Ferroelectrics and Frequency Control, Associate Editor: 2011–present
IEEE Nanotechnology Council, AdCom Representative: 2008-2013
IEEE Women in Engineering, Society Liaison: 2008-2013
IEEE Educational Committee Officer: 2006–present
Journal of Electroceramics, Editorial Board, 2007–present

Awards and patents

Awards 

 IEEE-Ultrasonics, Ferroelectrics and Frequency Control (UFFC) Ferroelectrics Young Investigator Award, 2013
NSF Career Award, 2013
Georgia Institute of Technology, Class of 1969 Teaching Fellow, 2012
Bennett Aerospace, Researcher of the year award, 2011

Patents 
 Soft Template Manufacturing of Nanomaterials, U.S. Patent 20130149500A1 with A. Bernal, 2011

References 

Living people
Year of birth missing (living people)
University of Padua alumni
Penn State College of Engineering alumni
Georgia Tech faculty
Mechanical engineers